Artantica is the fifth and last album by Dutch rap rock band Urban Dance Squad. The album marked the return of DJ DNA, who had been absent on the band's two previous recordings. Stylistically the album is very diverse (as are most by UDS), with vocalist Rudeboy often singing and rapping in the same song. The single "Happy Go Fucked Up" became a minor hit in Europe. Not long after the release of the album, the band broke up.

Track listing

 Step Off  (5:20)
 Happy Go Fucked Up  (4:55)
 Letter To Da Better  (4:45)
 Bank Stock 6 Zeros  (4:44)
 Hard-Headed Headstrong  (4:19)
 Craftmatic Adjustable Girl  (4:16)
 Fearless  (3:59)
 Ghost Called Loneliness  (3:44)
 Limousine  (4:00)
 Artantica  (3:47)
 Chain-Locked To Nowhere  (5:01)
 Q & A's On An O.D.  (3:50)
 Modern Woman (2:01)
 Music Entertainment  (5:07)

References

External links
 http://www.discogs.com/Urban-Dance-Squad-Artantica/release/458519

1999 albums
Urban Dance Squad albums
Virgin Records albums
Rap metal albums